Acoustic Sketches is an album by guitarist Phil Keaggy, released in 1996. Most pieces are performed on solo guitar.

Track listing
All songs were written by Phil Keaggy, unless otherwise noted.

 "Metamorphosis" - 4:54
 "Rivulets" - 3:00
 "Nellie's Tune" - 3:26
 "Passing Thought" - 1:33
 "The Marionette" - 3:51
 "Del's Bells" - 1:33
 "Looking Back" - 0:40
 "Paka" - 2:58
 "Spend My Life With You" - 5:56
 "Jam in the Pocket" - 4:12
 "Swing Low, Sweet Chariot" (Traditional) - 3:21
 "The 50th" - 7:03
 "Morning Snow" - 3:18
 "Spanish Fantasy" - 1:51
 "On Some Distant Shore" - 5:07
 "Icicles" - 2:20
 "On Second Thought" - 2:33
 "Griegarious" - 0:16
 "Legacy - 5:26

Personnel
Phil Keaggy: guitar

References

1996 albums
Phil Keaggy albums